Colvey is a surname. Notable people with the surname include:

 Joe Colvey (born 1948), former Canadian footballer
 Kip Colvey (born 1994), former New Zealand footballer
 Stéphanie Colvey (born 1949), Canadian photographer

See also
 Colley (surname)